"Grrrr" (stylised as "GRRRR") is an instrumental house song performed by French DJ David Guetta. It was released as the lead single from Guetta's compilation album, Fuck Me I'm Famous - Ibiza Mix 2009 and also appears on the deluxe edition of One Love, entitled One More Love.

Charts

References

External links
 http://davidguetta.com/disco/3428659006
 https://www.facebook.com/event.php?eid=133021720909
 http://australian-charts.com/showitem.asp?interpret=David+Guetta&titel=Grrrr&cat=s

2009 singles
David Guetta songs
Songs written by David Guetta
Songs written by Frédéric Riesterer
2009 songs
Song recordings produced by David Guetta